Westside Grovely FC is a football (soccer) club based in the locality of Grovely, Queensland, Australia. The club currently has Men's teams in the Football Queensland Premier League 5, and Football Queensland Metro competitions, as well as a Metro league Women's team. The club also has junior teams for all ages, and Masters team for overage players (Women's Over 30s, Men's Over 35s).

History

The club was established in 1964 as Budapest Grovely Soccer Club, playing at the sports ground in Hanran Street, Grovely (now part of the suburb Keperra). The club was renamed 'Grovely Soccer Club' in 1973, after the Queensland Soccer Federation banned the use of ethnic-based club names, and then renamed 'Westside Soccer Club' in 1978.

The club initially played in Brisbane's Division 2 for several years (tier 2 of the Brisbane competition), but from the mid-1970s and during the 1980s, the senior club's fortunes declined. The senior club became inactive after the 1988 season but was revived in 2006, reentering the Football Brisbane competition in Metro 3 (then tier 7). The club slowly progressed up the Metro leagues and began offering additional teams for senior players.

Westside finished second in the 2012 Brisbane Metro 1 season, the highest place of any non-Premier League team in the competition.

The club celebrated its 50th season in 2013, which saw the senior men's team compete in a new league structure introduced by Football Brisbane, taking its place Capital League 3. Westside finished in 2nd place behind Centenary Stormers, who they eliminated from the finals in the preliminary final. The 2013 Capital League 3 Grand Final represents the most successful finals campaign for the Men's team in recent times, which was capped by a Grand Final victory, beating New Farm 4–2 on penalties following a scoreless draw.

Further re-structuring of the Football Brisbane league system has resulted in Westside Grovely participating in Capital League 2. In 2019, the club achieved its highest finish to date, coming third and narrowly missing out on promotion to Capital League 1.

For the 2021 season, the club have a new coaching team in place, led by head coach Terry Campbell. The major sponsor of Westside Grovely is Brisbane based company Stafflink.

Another restructure of the football pyramid in Queensland was conducted in late 2021, with Westside Grovely confirmed a place in FQPL 5 for the 2022 season. Mauricio Mota was appointed Head Coach following the departure of Terry Campbell.

The club colours, red, green and white, are taken from the Hungarian national flag.

References

External links
Official Website
Football Brisbane Westside FC Page

Association football clubs established in 1964
Westside
1964 establishments in Australia